The Abhay-class corvettes of the Indian Navy are the customised variants of the Soviet s. The class was primarily intended for coastal patrol and anti-submarine warfare.
Last ship of the class is expected to be decommissioned till 2025.

Description 
Abhay class is modified from Pauk II class under Project 1241 PE. The ships were built at Volodarski shipyard in the former Soviet Union. Abhay class vessels are longer, have larger torpedo tubes and improved electronics when compared to the Pauk I class vessels. The ships in the class were named after former Abhay-class seaward defence boats.

Abhay class is to be upgraded with Abhay integrated sonar system developed by Naval Physical and Oceanographic Laboratory.

Service History 

INS Agray was damaged in 2004 when an anti-submarine rocket fired from the onboard RBU-1200 launcher misfired and exploded on the side of the ship. Following the accident, the vessel was converted into a patrol vessel and a trials ship for electronic warfare systems.

The Ministry of Defence cleared acquisition of 16 shallow water anti-submarine vessels to replace the Abhay class of vessels.

INS Ajay was decommissioned on 19 September, 2022 after 32 years of service in the Indian Navy.

Ships of the class

See also
List of active Indian Navy ships

References

 
Corvette classes
India–Soviet Union relations